Local elections were held in Kiambu County to elect a Governor and County Assembly on 4 March 2013. Under the new constitution, which was passed in a 2010 referendum, the 2013 general elections were the first in which Governors and members of the County Assemblies for the newly created counties were elected.

Gubernatorial election

Prospective candidatures

George Nyanja (Former MP, Limuru Constituency) also made public his intentions to run but later changed his mind and vie for the senatorial position:. Dr James Nyoro is a former Managing Director, Rockefeller Foundation Africa while William Kabogo is the MP for Juja Constituency

National Assembly
The following members were elected:
 Githunguri Constituency - Njoroge Baiya 
 Kiambaa Constituency - Paul Karuga Koinange
 Kabete Constituency - Cliford Waititu 
 Limuru Constituency - John Kiragu Chege
 Lari Constituency - Joseph M. Kahangara
 Gatundu North Constituency - Francis Kigo njenga
 Gatundu South Constituency - Moses Kuria
 Ruiru Constituency - Esther Gathogo
 Thika Town Constituency - Alice Wambui Ng'ang'a
 Kikuyu Constituency - Hon. Anthony Kimani Inchung'wa

References

 

2013 local elections in Kenya